Dan Owe Michael Hylander known as Dan Hylander (born 21 June 1954 in Malmö, Sweden) is a Swedish songwriter, pop and rock singer and guitarist. He has collaborated prominently with Py Bäckman and the band Raj Montana Band, which served as a backing vocal group for both Bäckman and Hylander.

Hylander's commercial breakthrough came in the early 1980s as Dan Hylander & Raj Montana Band made up of Hylander with David Carlson (guitar), Ola Johansson (bass), Clarence Öfwerman (keyboard), Hasse Olsson (organ and keyboard), Pelle Alsing (drums). In 1984 Hylander won the "Rockbjörnen" award as the year's "Swedish male artist".

In the mid-1980s, Hylander made a solo career with a newly formed backing band Kosmonaut, although keeping occasional reunions with Raj Montana Band.

In 2004, he co-wrote with  Swedish singer/songwriter Tomas Ledin all the songs on Ledin's album Med vidöppna fönster (meaning With wide open windows).

In 2007, Hylander moved to Bolivia with his family, but decided to return to Sweden in early 2016.

Raj Montana Band re-united in 2018, playing gigs and planning a new album.

Discography

Albums

Live albums

Compilation albums

References

Swedish male singers
Swedish songwriters
1954 births
Living people
Singers from Malmö